KNTK (93.7 FM), branded as "93.7 The Ticket", is a radio station broadcasting a sports format.  Licensed to Firth, Nebraska, United States, the station serves the Lincoln area.  Their studios are located on North 48th Street in Lincoln, while its transmitter is located north of Firth.

External links

Lancaster County, Nebraska
Radio stations established in 2010
NTK
Sports radio stations in the United States